Niki & The Dove are a Swedish indietronica duo from Stockholm, formed in February 2010. The group consists of Malin Dahlström (vocals and production) and Gustaf Karlöf (production), and are signed by TEN Music Group, licensed to  Sub Pop and Mercury Records. On 5 December 2011, the BBC announced that the duo had been nominated for the BBC's Sound of 2012 poll, which they ultimately finished in fifth place.

Discography

Studio albums

EPs

Singles

Promotional singles

Music videos

Tours
 NME Radar Tour (2011) (as supporting act)
 Hurts Tour (2011) (as supporting act)

Awards and nominations

References

External links
 

English-language singers from Sweden
Mercury Records artists
Musical groups established in 2010
Musical groups from Stockholm
Swedish musical trios
Sub Pop artists
Swedish synthpop groups
2010 establishments in Sweden